Van Lanschot is the name of a Dutch patrician family.

Christiaen Jan Maessone who lived in Zundert at the end of the 15th century is the earliest known member of the family. The family was involved in different industries such as banking, brick-making and brewing. In 1737, the family founded the Van Lanschot Bankiers. Some members lived on the castle and estate Zwijnsbergen in Helvoirt.

Notable members 
 Cornelis van Lanschot (1699-1757), was a Dutch banker and founder of the bank Van Lanschot
 Franciscus van Lanschot(1768-1851), was a Dutch entrepreneur and banker
 Frans Johan van Lanschot (1875-1949), was a Dutch jurist and Mayor of 's-Hertogenbosch
 Cees van Lanschot (1897-1953), was a Dutch banker
 Willem van Lanschot (1914-2001), was a Dutch banker. He was married to Jonkvrouw Louise Marie van Meeuwen
Antoinette Sandbach (1969-present) is a British politician and the Member of Parliament for Eddisbury. She is a daughter to Anne Marie Antoinette of the Dutch Van Lanschot family
Reinier van Lanschot (1989-present) is leading the pan-European party Volt Europa as one of its two co-presidents (2019-present)

Literature 
 Nederland's Patriciaat 80 (1997), pp. 182–227.

Van Lanschot Kempen

References 

Van Lanschot (family)
Dutch families
Surnames
Dutch patrician families